is a Japanese former footballer who last played for Roasso Kumamoto.

Career
Katayama retired at the end of the 2019 season.

Club statistics
Updated to 23 February 2017.

References

External links

Profile at Roasso Kumamoto

1983 births
Living people
Kokushikan University alumni
Association football people from Nara Prefecture
Japanese footballers
J1 League players
J2 League players
Nagoya Grampus players
Yokohama FC players
Roasso Kumamoto players
Association football defenders